A Million Happy Nows is a 2017 American independent drama film written by Marisa Calin and directed by Albert Alarr.  The film stars Crystal Chappell and Jessica Leccia as a lesbian couple dealing with the diagnosis of early onset Alzheimer's.

Veteran actress Lainey Allen (Chappell) is tired of being sidelined for younger talent on the soap she has starred in for twenty years. Coupled with finding it harder to retain her lines, she decides not to renew her contract, and she and her publicist and partner, Eva Morales (Leccia), move to a beach house overlooking the ocean on the Central California coast. The move highlights some small changes in Lainey’s personality – mild depression that Eva puts down to leaving the show. But when Lainey starts to forget more than can be attributed to stress, Eva insists on a visit to the doctor.

A Million Happy Nows chronicles Lainey and Eva’s changing relationship as they struggle to deal with the diagnosis of Lainey’s Early Onset Alzheimer’s, the prospect of an indomitable woman’s future of dependence and her single support system – the woman who was once in awe of her, became everything to her, and will now look after her.

Cast

 Crystal Chappell as Lainey Allen 
 Jessica Leccia as Eva Morales 
 Hillary B. Smith as Val 
 Dendrie Taylor as Julie 
 Dan Gauthier as Jason 
 Robert Gant as Dr. Hansen
 Marisa Calin as Kate
 Dale Raoul as Wendy
 Roberta Valderrama as Mindy
 Cuyle Carvin as Mike 
 Andrew Dits as Bartender 
 Michael Corbett as Aden
 Brett Weinstock as Press Guy 
 Donnell Turner as Mr. Handsome 
 Susan Seaforth Hayes as Katy 
 Mark Hapka as Soap Actor 
 Elissa Reilly Slater as Soap Actor

Production
Stars Crystal Chappell and Jessica Leccia acquired a very devoted fanbase following their extremely popular pairing as Olivia Spencer and Natalia Rivera Aitoro on CBS’ Guiding Light. Since airing in 2009, the storyline, given the portmanteau “Otalia”, which received critical acclaim and earned Chappell an Outstanding Lead Actress Daytime Emmy nomination, has received around 30 million views on YouTube.

In response to the overwhelming global support and positive outpouring from the underrepresented LGBT community, Chappell (now a recipient of the Human Rights Campaign Ally Award) created her production company, Open Book Productions, to bring original programming to the screen, producing Venice: The Series, which received the 2011 Emmy for Outstanding Special Class Short Format Daytime - the first Emmy awarded to content produced for the web, and the 2014 Emmy for Outstanding New Approaches - Drama Series  She continued to produce original and creatively uncensored programming with her latest series, LGBT themed political drama Beacon Hill, which was also nominated for the 2015 Outstanding New Approaches - Drama Series Emmy. 
Open Book Productions was approached by writer Marisa Calin in 2013 and began the collaboration to bring A Million Happy Nows to the screen with Calin's production company Perfect Features.

A Million Happy Nows represents the first big-screen pairing of Crystal Chappell and Jessica Leccia.

Principal photography took place in California over 20 days in late 2014. The majority of the film was shot in a house overlooking the ocean on the Malibu coast. Post-production was completed at Technicolor in New York in mid 2016.

Release
A Million Happy Nows premiered on the festival circuit in January 2017, and was officially selected for most major LGBT festivals throughout the year including Mardi Gras Film Festival (Sydney), Inside Out Film and Video Festival (Toronto), FilmOut (San Diego), Frameline (San Francisco), Outfest (Los Angeles) and Newfest (New York)  In September 2016, Sales Agent Shoreline Entertainment picked up the rights to the film, and in November 2017, the distribution rights for Germany, Switzerland, Austria, Lichtenstein and Luxembourg were sold to German distributor, Pro-Fun Media.  The film was released in those territories as Millionen Momente Voller Glückin in mid December, 2017 and ended the year at number 1 in the DVD category in LGBT films on Amazon.de. North American rights went to Gravitas Ventures in the same month. They released the film across most Video-on-Demand platforms, including iTunes and Amazon Video, in the U.S and Canada on January 23, 2018, under the title 1 Million Happy Nows. The film was released on DVD and Blu-ray in the U.S. in May, 2018. Releases followed in Taiwan, Vietnam, Cambodia and Malaysia by Creative Century Entertainment, in Bulgaria by Medialine, in Poland by Tongariro Releasing, and in Brazil by Encripta.

Reception
Prominent magazine AfterEllen, which focuses on the portrayal of lesbian and bisexual women in the media, featured A Million Happy Nows at number 6 on their list of [13 best films of 2017]. In their review from May 2017, they described the film as ‘dramatic gold’. Curve Magazine also included the film at number 9 on their list of 10 best films of the year about LGBTIQ woman, alongside critical and commercial successes such as Battle of the Sexes starring Emma Stone. A Million Happy Nows was also the winner of Curve Magazine's Mystery Movie Poll to screen a film for audiences at ClexaCon, the first convention celebrating the LGBTQ community and its allies, born of the pairing of character from the CW's The 100, Clarke and Lexa. The film came away with the film festival's award for Best Feature.

A Million Happy Nows has received positive reviews across the board since its premiere at the Mardi Gras Film Festival in January 2017 with the Sydney Arts Guide writing “this film is a labour of love and it's there in every frame and every word...
stay(s) with you long after you emerge into the outside glare.”  The Hollywood Times described it as “Absolutely Phenomenal” celebrating the British invasion at Outfest in the form of opening night film God's Own Country, and British writer Marisa Calin's win for Best First Feature for A Million Happy Nows.

Accolades

References

External links
 A Million Happy Nows on IMDb
 
 A Million Happy Nows on Facebook
 Gravitas Ventures 

2017 romantic drama films
2017 films
American romantic drama films
2010s English-language films
2010s American films